Snow Flower is a 2006 South Korean television series starring Kim Hee-ae, Go Ara, Lee Jae-ryong and Kim Ki-bum. It aired on SBS from November 20, 2006 to January 9, 2007 on Mondays and Tuesdays at 21:55 for 16 episodes.

A story about a mother who tries to protect her daughter out of love but inflicts pain instead, the drama series was based on the same-titled novel written by Kim Soo-hyun. It was also adapted into the 1992 film Flower in Snow starring Yoon Jeong-hee and Lee Mi-yeon.

Plot
When she was young, Yoo Da-mi (Go Ara) was forced to move in with her grandmother. Her father subsequently disappeared from her life, and since then, she'd always believed that he'd died. As time passes, her mother Lee Kang-ae (Kim Hee-ae) becomes one of the country's bestselling authors. Consequently, she never found time to spend with her daughter. One day, Da-mi accidentally intercepts a phone call from her father, Yoo Geon-hee (Lee Jae-ryong), and realizes that her mother has lied to her all these years about her father's whereabouts. Angry, Da-mi rebels by deciding not to go to college, despite having excellent grades in high school. On a whim, she accompanies her friend to an audition, and becomes an actress instead. Coincidentally, the first film Da-mi stars in is based on one of Kang-ae's novels. During one of their heated arguments, Da-mi tells her mother that she's going to Japan to search for her father. Meanwhile, at her side is her boss's stepbrother, Ha Young-chan (Kim Kibum), a family friend who secretly loves Da-mi and keeps helping her even though she's rejected his feelings.

Cast

Main characters
Kim Hee-ae as Lee Kang-ae
Go Ara as Yoo Da-mi
Yoon Jung-eun as young Da-mi
Lee Jae-ryong as Yoo Geon-hee
Kim Ki-bum as Ha Young-chan
Lee Chan as Ha In-chan, Young-chan's brother

Supporting characters
Kim Sung-joon as Park Dong-woo, Kang-ae's boyfriend
Ahn Jae-hwan as Min Ji-seob, Kang-ae's doctor friend
Kim Young-ok as Kang-ae's mother and Da-mi's grandmother
Kim Bo-yeon as Choi Jung-sun, Kang-ae's business assistant
Song Seok-ho as Lee Man-ho, Jung-sun's husband
Hwang Geum-hee as Lee Shin-ae, Jung-sun and Man-ho's eldest daughter
Lee Gun-joo as Lee Shin-beom, Jung-sun and Man-ho's son
Hayama as Sakae, Geon-hee's Japanese wife
Hoshino as Yuka, Geon-hee's Japanese daughter
Kim Min-chae as Choi Jung-ja
Park Ji-mi as Da-mi's friend
Kim Ha-yoon as Oh Hee-jin
Shin Kwi-shik

International broadcast
In Thailand aired on Modernine TV  beginning July 29, 2008 to October 1, 2008, on Mondays-Wednesdays at 13:05-14:00

Notes

References

External links
Snow Flower official SBS website 

Seoul Broadcasting System television dramas
Korean-language television shows
2006 South Korean television series debuts
2007 South Korean television series endings
Television shows based on South Korean novels
South Korean romance television series
Television series by Samhwa Networks